Ice Age: The Great Egg-Scapade is a 2016 computer-animated television special, produced by Blue Sky Studios and directed by Ricardo Curtis. It premiered on Fox during the Easter season. Most of the actors reprise their roles from the previous installments except Aziz Ansari, whose role as Squint was replaced by Seth Green. This Easter special takes place between Continental Drift and Collision Course.

Plot
Five years after the events of the fourth film and four months before the events of the fifth film, Manny and his crew get ready for Easter. While Ellie struggles to make the decorations single-handedly, Manny and Diego try to watch some hawk fights between a hawk and different animals. Crash and Eddie unsuccessfully attempt to prank Peaches, starting the first April Fools' Day. Peaches wants to spend Easter with her friends. Scrat has excavated in the underground from the Death Valley to the new herd's Valley, and has found his acorn again. He once again loses his acorn, when it becomes a tree. In the meantime, Sid decides to look after eggs for the owners of them, much to the scorn of Manny and Diego.

Meanwhile, ex-pirate bunny Squint has been living in his home hole for the past three months with his lazy brother, Clint. After getting back on his feet, the pirate sees Manny and his group as he plans to have his revenge for what he did to Captain Gutt and his ship. Squint confronts them, demanding a new ship, but is unsuccessful. However, he decides to frame Sid for stealing the eggs when he falls asleep. In order to prove his innocence, Manny and Diego help Sid look for them, and Clint lends a hand by giving them a map to the eggs, which have been painted by Squint to camouflage them. When they retrieve the eggs and see through their disguise, they find they are one egg short, with Squint telling them that if they don't make a ship for him by the next day, the egg will be scrambled.

Clint leads his brother into an ambush by Manny, Sid, and Diego. They find the egg when it's revealed to be painted into an acorn and has been taken by Scrat. When Manny washes the paint off, a disappointed Scrat throws the egg off a cliff and the gang manage to retrieve it. Squint battles with Sid to get the egg, but the ice cracks, signaling Sid to defeat Squint with the help of Crash and Eddie's latest prank, which is also a trap set up by Sid. After that, the mammoth family decide to spend Easter together and Sid suggests that Clint be the Easter Bunny by painting eggs every year and hiding them.

Meanwhile, Scrat has a basket of acorns and sees a chocolate fountain that he covers his acorns with but falls in. Squint uses Scrat's acorn basket as a ship, but it sinks, and Scrat is unable to stop him due to being covered in chocolate from the chocolate fountain that dries up like cement.

Voice cast

 Ray Romano as Manny
 John Leguizamo as Sid
 Denis Leary as Diego
 Taraji P. Henson as Ethel
 Queen Latifah as Ellie
 Gabriel Iglesias as Cholly Bear
 Wendy Williams as Condor Mom
 Lili Estefan as Gladys Glypto
 Blake Anderson as Clint
 Keke Palmer as Peaches
 Seann William Scott as Crash
 Josh Peck as Eddie
 Seth Green as Squint (He was previously voiced by Aziz Ansari)
 Chris Wedge as Scrat

Reprising their roles from Ice Age: Continental Drift are Peter Dinklage as Captain Gutt, Rebel Wilson as Raz, Nick Frost as Flynn and Kunal Nayyar as Gupta as shown in a flashback sequence to the events of the film.

Release
The Great Egg-Scapade was televised by Fox on March 20, 2016, as a lead-in to its live special The Passion: New Orleans.

The Great Egg-Scapade was released on DVD March 7, 2017.

References

External links
 

2016 television specials
2010s American television specials
2010s animated television specials
Easter television specials
American television specials
Animated films about animals
2010s English-language films
Films scored by Mark Mothersbaugh
Fox television specials
Blue Sky Studios short films
Fox Television Animation films
Ice Age (franchise) films
Easter Bunny in television
20th Century Fox Television films